Food for Fighters is a 1943 propaganda short about nutrition in the Armed Services produced by the Office of War Information.

The films open with a young conscript first getting weighed before going into the army. He asked what the soldiers will eat, but was dismissively told "Only beans." The narration then starts and informs the audience that since the last war, nutrition has become a science and there is even a whole Quartermaster Corp laboratory devoted to making more nutritious food for the armed services. Better food means better soldiers and even healthier civilians.

The eating habits of the national adversaries were scrutinized, including a claim that the Japanese produce great energy from rice. Various experiments with American food preparedness are made, including determining what foods would be most effective in certain climates.

The results from these tests led the army to create vitamin-enriched foods that would help maximize the energy gained from the given product.

See also 

 List of Allied propaganda films of World War II

External links 

 
 

1943 films
American World War II propaganda shorts
American black-and-white films
1940s American films